The 1975 World Fencing Championships were held in Budapest, Hungary.

Medal table

Medal summary

Men's events

Women's events

References

FIE Results

World Fencing Championships
World Fencing Championships, 1975
International fencing competitions hosted by Hungary
1970s in Budapest
International sports competitions in Budapest
1975 in fencing